Imperial Majesty (His/Her Imperial Majesty, abbreviated as HIM) is a style used by Emperors and Empresses. It distinguishes the status of an emperor/empress from that of a King/Queen, who are simply styled Majesty. Holders of this style have sometimes been observed to follow religious leaders who are styled "His Holiness" in public ceremonies.

King-Emperors and Queen-Empresses sometimes have used the style Imperial and Royal Majesty (e.g., The Empress Frederick's style Her Imperial and Royal Majesty The German Empress and Queen of Prussia). The reigning British monarchs from 1876–1948, also being the Emperor/Empress of India had the style of "His/Her Imperial Majesty".

The last Shah of Iran, Mohammad Reza Pahlavi, also used the style of "Imperial Majesty". Today, the style is assumed by Farah Pahlavi, the exiled Shahbanu of Iran.

Incongruously, in modern times the Emperor of Japan rarely uses the style of "Imperial Majesty", instead preferring the simpler style of "Majesty". This is despite the imperial titles still used by the rest of the imperial household.

See also
Imperial and Royal Majesty
Imperial Majesty Cruise Line

References

Royal styles